Herbert Moulton (September 16, 1922 – June 14, 1994) was an American film producer and director. He won two Academy Awards, both for Best Short Subject. The first award was in 1946 for Stairway to Light and the second in 1948 for Goodbye, Miss Turlock.

Selected filmography
 Goodbye, Miss Turlock (1948)
 Stairway to Light (1945)

References

External links

1922 births
1994 deaths
American film producers
American film directors
20th-century American businesspeople